New Gloucester is a town in Cumberland County, Maine, in the United States. It is home to the Sabbathday Lake Shaker Village, the last active Shaker village in the U.S.  The town's population was 5,676 at the 2020 census.

New Gloucester is part of Maine's Portland–South Portland–Biddeford, metropolitan statistical area.

History

New Gloucester was established in 1736 under a Massachusetts Bay Colony grant of a  tract of land in the Maine Territory to sixty inhabitants of the Gloucester fishing village on Cape Ann. The first settlers followed the road newly bushed out from North Yarmouth and built cabins on Harris Hill between 1739 and 1742. The settlement was abandoned from 1744–1751 due to the heightened native tribe attacks during King George's War.

Settlers returned and in 1753 commenced work on a two-story, fifty-foot square blockhouse with a palisade stockade  on a side. This was home to twelve families for six years. The men worked at clearing the surrounding  of common land under the protection of two swivel guns manned by a garrison of six soldiers. One attack was made upon the fort, resulting in one scalping and two men captured. As the Native Americans gradually withdrew to Canada, the settlers moved out into their own newly built homes. The blockhouse continued to serve for worship and town affairs until the first meetinghouse was built in 1773. In 1788, the blockhouse was sold at auction for seven bushels of corn and moved to a farm in the Intervale, where it was rebuilt as a hog house.

New Gloucester was incorporated on March 8, 1774, and was named after Gloucester, Massachusetts, the native home of a large share of the early settlers.

New Gloucester became a half shire town with Portland, and the courts met here from 1791 until the organization of Oxford County in 1805, when they returned to Portland. With good soil for agriculture, the town developed as a prosperous farming community. In 1858, when the population was 1,848, other industries included six sawmills, two gristmills and two tanneries.

Sabbathday Lake Shaker Village was founded in 1783 by the United Society of True Believers at what was then called Thompson's Pond Plantation. It was formally organized on April 19, 1794. Today, the village is the last of some over two-dozen religious societies, stretching from Maine to Florida, to be operated by the Shakers themselves.

Geography
New Gloucester is drained by the Royal River.

The town is crossed by Interstate 95, U.S. Route 202 and state routes 4, 26 and 231.
It is bordered by the town of Raymond to the west, Poland to the northwest, the city of Auburn to the northeast, Durham to the east, Pownal and North Yarmouth to the southeast, and Gray to the southwest.

Amenities
The privately owned, unattended Cliff Dow Airport is located on Highview Drive, two miles southwest of New Gloucester, to the east of Interstate 95. Its FAA identifier is 54ME, and it was activated in 2006. Its unpaved runway headings are 5 (for landings) and 23 (for takeoffs) with an AMSL elevation of 415 feet. Its area control center is Boston Center, while its flight service station is Bangor.

Climate
This climatic region is typified by large seasonal temperature differences, with warm to hot (and often humid) summers and cold (sometimes severely cold) winters.  According to the Köppen Climate Classification system, New Gloucester has a humid continental climate, abbreviated "Dfb" on climate maps.

Demographics

2010 census
As of the census of 2010, there were 5,542 people, 2,092 households, and 1,534 families living in the town. The racial makeup of the town was 97.5% White, 0.3% African American, 0.1% Native American, 0.4% Asian, 0.1% from other races, and 1.6% from two or more races. Hispanic or Latino of any race were 0.8% of the population.

There were 2,092 households, of which 36.2% had children under the age of 18 living with them, 59.9% were married couples living together, 8.2% had a female householder with no husband present, 5.2% had a male householder with no wife present, and 26.7% were non-families. 18.5% of all households were made up of individuals, and 4.7% had someone living alone who was 65 years of age or older. The average household size was 2.63 and the average family size was 2.99.

The median age in the town was 39.5 years. 24.5% of residents were under the age of 18; 6.6% were between the ages of 18 and 24; 28.6% were from 25 to 44; 31.7% were from 45 to 64; and 8.5% were 65 years of age or older. The gender makeup of the town was 50.9% male and 49.1% female.

2000 census
As of the census of 2000, there were 4,803 people, 1,761 households, and 1,313 families living in the town. The racial makeup of the town was 98.17% White, 0.23% African American, 0.06% Native American, 0.40% Asian, 0.10% Pacific Islander, 0.12% from other races, and 0.92% from two or more races. Hispanic or Latino of any race were 0.56% of the population.

There were 1,761 households, out of which 39.2% had children under the age of 18 living with them, 61.2% were married couples living together, 8.9% had a female householder with no husband present, and 25.4% were non-families. 18.6% of all households were made up of individuals, and 6.3% had someone living alone who was 65 years of age or older.  The average household size was 2.71 and the average family size was 3.08.

In the town, the population was spread out, with 28.8% under the age of 18, 6.2% from 18 to 24, 35.0% from 25 to 44, 22.5% from 45 to 64, and 7.5% who were 65 years of age or older.  The median age was 36 years. For every 100 females, there were 102.2 males.  For every 100 females age 18 and over, there were 99.1 males.

As of a 2008 estimate, the median income for a household in the town was $60,664 and the per capita income for the town was $24,958. As of the 2000 census and the median income for a family was $57,727. Males had a median income of $35,699 versus $26,358 for females.  About 4.0% of families and 5.4% of the population were below the poverty line, including 7.6% of those under age 18 and 9.3% of those age 65 or over.

Arts and culture

Sites of interest
 New Gloucester Historical Society & Museum
 Sabbathday Lake Shaker Village & Museum
 Royal River Conservation Trust Intervale & Pisgah Hill Preserves
 New Gloucester Veterans Monument

Education
 Maine School Administrative District 15
 Merriconeag High School
 Collaborative School
 Wayfinder Schools

Notable people 

 Mildred Barker, musician, scholar, and Shaker Eldress
 Joseph Brackett, American songwriter and Shaker Elder
 Peleg Chandler lawyer, journalist, and politician in Boston, Massachusetts
 Todd Chretien, activist
 Jonathan Greenleaf Eveleth, oil company founder
 Samuel Fessenden, abolitionist, legislator
 Samuel C. Fessenden, US congressman
 William Pitt Fessenden, US congressman, Secretary of the Treasury
 Benjamin F. Hayes, professor at Bates College
 Sara Plummer Lemmon, botanist of Western USA, namesake of Mt. Lemmon near Tucson

 Ezekiel Whitman, US congressman

References

External links
 Town of New Gloucester official website
 New Gloucester Public Library
 Royal River Riders Snowmobile Club
 The New Gloucester Centennial, September 7, 1874 (1875)
 The Independent, local newspaper
 Maine.gov – New Gloucester, Maine
 Maine Genealogy: New Gloucester, Cumberland County, Maine
 Maine Office of Tourism

 
Towns in Cumberland County, Maine
Portland metropolitan area, Maine
Towns in Maine
18th-century establishments in Maine
Populated places established in the 18th century